S&M2 (stylized as S&M2) is a live album by American heavy metal band Metallica and the San Francisco Symphony. It is a follow-up to S&M, a live collaborative album released in 1999. The album was recorded during a live performance in San Francisco at the Chase Center in 2019. The performance was also filmed and released theatrically on October 9, 2019.

Background and recording

On April 21 and 22, 1999, Metallica, in collaboration with the San Francisco Symphony and Michael Kamen, recorded and filmed a concert at the Berkeley Community Theater. The performance was released as a film and a live album in November 1999.

In March 2019, Metallica announced the S&M2 concert. The concert, which was similarly performed in collaboration with the San Francisco Symphony, was planned in celebration of the 20th anniversary of S&M. The concert was recorded and filmed at the Chase Center in San Francisco on September 6 and 8, 2019, with Edwin Outwater and Michael Tilson Thomas conducting the symphony orchestra. The concert also marked the grand opening of the Chase Center. Filming was directed by Wayne Isham, who also directed S&M.

Release
The film was released in theaters on October 9, 2019. It earned over $1.2 million at the North American box office, and totaled $5.5 million internationally, making it the highest-grossing rock cinema event ever. As a result, the film was shown theatrically for a second time on October 30, 2019.

The live album was released on August 28, 2020. The Blu-ray release included a new revised version of the film seen in theaters edited by the band, with remixed and remastered audio plus behind the scenes footage.

Critical reception

At Metacritic, which assigns a normalized rating out of 100 to reviews from mainstream publications, the album received an average score of 78 based on eight reviews, indicating "generally favorable reviews".

Critics generally praised the album as a worthy successor of S&M. Paul Brannigan of Kerrang! gave the performance a perfect rating, writing that the album "stands as a tribute both to Metallica’s growing confidence as players and composers, and an absolute vindication of their decision to revisit one of their most inspired creative outings."

In a mixed review, Andy Cush of Pitchfork felt that the album had the same issues that S&M did. Cush wrote that the songs are not suited to an orchestral accompaniment, writing "Metallica’s best songs, intricate and ambitious though they may be, are not actually well suited for the additional orchestrating they get here, precisely because they are plenty symphonic already." Cush was also critical of the song selection for S&M2, noting that "Of the 20 pieces of music here, more than half appeared in a similar form more than two decades ago on the first S&M."

Commercial performance
S&M2 debuted at No. 4 on Billboard with 56,000 equivalent album units, with 53,000 units of that coming from album sales.

Track listing

Personnel 

Metallica
 James Hetfield – lead vocals, rhythm guitar, guitar solo on "Nothing Else Matters", "Master of Puppets" and "The Outlaw Torn", acoustic (rhythm) guitar on "All Within My Hands", production
 Lars Ulrich – drums, production
 Kirk Hammett – lead guitar, backing vocals, acoustic (lead) guitar on "All Within My Hands", sitar on "Wherever I May Roam"
 Robert Trujillo – bass guitar, backing vocals

San Francisco Symphony

 Edwin Outwater – conductor
 Michael Tilson Thomas – conductor on "Scythian Suite, Opus 20 II: The Enemy God and the Dance of the Dark Spirits", "The Iron Foundry, Opus 19", "The Unforgiven III" and "Enter Sandman", keyboards on "Enter Sandman"
 Scott Pingel – bass solo for "(Anesthesia) – Pulling Teeth"
 Nadya Tichman (concertmaster), Jeremy Constant, Mariko Smiley, Melissa Kleinbart, Sarn Oliver, Naomi Kazama Hull, Victor Romasevich, Yun Chu, Yukiko Kurakata, Katie Kadarauch – first violins
 Jessie Fellows, Polina Sedukh, David Chernyavsky, Raushan Akhmedyarova, Chen Zhao, Adam Smyla, Sarah Knutson, Yuna Lee – second violins
 Yun Jie Liu, John Schoening, Christina King, Gina Cooper, David Gaudry, Matthew Young, David Kim, Nanci Severance – violas
 Amos Yang, Margaret Tait, Jill Rachuy Brindel, Stephen Tramontozzi, Shu-Yi Pai, Richard Andaya, Miriam Perkoff, Adelle-Akiko Kearns – cellos
 Scott Pingel, Daniel G. Smith, S. Mark Wright, Charles Chandler, Chris Gilbert, William Ritchen – basses
 Robin McKee, Linda Lukas, Catherine Payne – flutes
 James Button, Pamela Smith, Russ deLuna – oboes
 Luis Baez, David Neuman, Jerome Simas – clarinets
 Stephen Paulson, Rob Weir, Steven Braunstein – bassons
 Robert Ward, Jonathan Ring, Bruce Roberts, Daniel Hawkins, Chris Cooper, Joshua Paulus, Jeff Garza – horns
 Aaron Schuman, Joseph Brown, Robert Giambruno, John Freeman – trumpets
 Timothy Higgins, Nick Platoff, John Engelkes, Jeff Budin – trombones
 Jeffrey Anderson – tuba
 Edward Stephan – timpani
 Jacob Nissly, James Lee Wyatt III, Tom Hemphill, Robert Klieger – percussion
 Douglas Rioth – harp
 Marc Shapiro – keyboard
 Margo Kieser, John Campbell, Matt Gray – librarians

Additional musicians
 Avi Vinocur – backing vocals on "All Within My Hands"

Technical personnel

 Greg Fidelman – production, mixing
 Edwin Outwater – musical direction
 Michael Tilson Thomas – additional conceptualization
 Bruce Coughlin, Michael Kamen – arrangement
 Scott Pingel – arrangement on "(Anesthesia) – Pulling Teeth"
 Emily Grisham, Adriana Grace, David Horne, Larry Spivack, Frederick Alden Terry – copyists
 Ann Shuttlesworth, Patrick DiCenso – transcribers
 John Harris, Jay Vicari, Brian Flanzbaum – recording engineering
 Bran Vibberts, Bob Wartinbee, Charlie Campbell, Mike Fortunato, Jimmy Goldsmith, Dave Schwerkolt – recording crew
 Sara Lyn Killion, Dan Monti, Jim Monti, Jason Gossman, Kent Matcke, Billy Joe Bowers – engineering, editing
 Bob Ludwig – mastering
 Anton Corbijn – band photography
 Stan Musilek – cover/instrument photography
 Brett Murray – additional audience photography
 David Turner – album package design, art direction
 Alex Tenta – album package layout, additional art direction

Charts

Weekly charts

Year-end charts

Certifications

Notes

References

2020 live albums
Albums produced by Greg Fidelman
Collaborative albums
Live symphonic metal albums
Metallica live albums
Music videos directed by Wayne Isham
San Francisco Symphony albums
Symphonic metal albums by American artists
Sequel albums